Eravipuram railway station or Iravipuram railway station (Code:IRP) is one among the 4 railway stations serving the Indian city of Kollam, Kerala. Eravipuram railway station falls under the Thiruvananthapuram railway division of the Southern Railway zone of Indian Railways. It is a 'F-Class' halt railway station. The annual passenger earnings from Eravipuram railway station during 2011–2012 was Rs. 5,85,813.

Eravipuram is about 5.3 km away from Kollam city. Eravipuram is well connected with various cities like Kollam, Trivandrum, Kottayam, Madurai, Tirunelveli, Nagercoil, Kanyakumari and towns like Paravur, Punalur, Kayamkulam, Karunagappalli, Kottarakkara, Varkala, Chirayinkeezh through Indian Railways.

Services

See also
 Eravipuram
 Kollam
 Paravur
 Karunagappalli railway station
 Kollam Junction railway station
 Paravur railway station

References

Railway stations in Kollam
Eravipuram
Thiruvananthapuram railway division
Railway stations opened in 1918